Mount Warspite is a  mountain summit located in Peter Lougheed Provincial Park in the Canadian Rockies of Alberta, Canada. The peak is visible from the Smith-Dorrien Road (742), and Alberta Highway 40 in the Kananaskis Lakes area. Mount Warspite's nearest higher peak is Mount Black Prince,  to the northwest.

Like so many of the mountains in Kananaskis Country, Mount Warspite received its name from the persons and ships involved in the 1916 Battle of Jutland, a major sea battle of the First World War. Mount Warspite was named in 1917 for the British battleship HMS Warspite, one of the most decorated and revered ships in Royal Navy history that fought during the Battle of Jutland in World War I, and survived to also serve in World War II. The mountain's name was  officially adopted in 1922 by the Geographical Names Board of Canada.

Geology
Mount Warspite is composed of sedimentary rock laid down during the Precambrian to Jurassic periods. Formed in shallow seas, this sedimentary rock was pushed east and over the top of younger rock during the Laramide orogeny.

Climate
Based on the Köppen climate classification, Mount Warspite is located in a subarctic climate zone with cold, snowy winters, and mild summers. Temperatures can drop below −20 °C with wind chill factors below −30 °C. Precipitation runoff from the mountain drains into tributaries of the Kananaskis River, thence into the Bow River.

See also

 List of mountains in the Canadian Rockies
 Geography of Alberta

References

External links
 Mt. Warspite photo: Flickr
 Mt. Warspite pano: Flickr
 Mount Warspite weather: Mountain Forecast

Two-thousanders of Alberta
Canadian Rockies
Alberta's Rockies